Mutiny is a 1917 American silent drama film directed by Lynn Reynolds and starring Myrtle Gonzalez, Jack Curtis and George Hernandez.

Cast
 Myrtle Gonzalez as Esther Whitaker
 Jack Curtis as Aaron Whitaker
 George Hernandez as Grandfather Whitaker
 Fred Harrington as Caleb Whitaker
 Val Paul as Jacob Babcock
 Ed Brady as Eben Wiggs

References

Bibliography
 Robert B. Connelly. The Silents: Silent Feature Films, 1910-36, Volume 40, Issue 2. December Press, 1998.

External links

 

1917 films
1917 drama films
American silent feature films
American drama films
American black-and-white films
Universal Pictures films
Films directed by Lynn Reynolds
1910s English-language films
1910s American films
Silent American drama films